Bitchin' Rides (known outside the United States as Salt Lake Garage in Italy and Kindig Customs elsewhere) is a reality styled Velocity TV show featuring Dave Kindig from the Salt Lake City, Utah-based company Kindig It Designs as they show their process of restoring and rebuilding vehicles. The show was successful in its first season and is currently on its eighth season while also becoming Velocity's most popular series. Bitchin' Rides can also be watched through VELOCITY, now known as  Motor Trend OnDemand. 

In each episode, Kindig and his team meet a client, review a car, create a design, then the team takes apart and rebuilds the vehicle to create a beautiful unique masterpiece. Featured projects include a '33 Ford Tudor, '57 Chevrolet Corvette, an Audi R8 Spyder, a '69 Chevrolet Camaro, a '62 Volkswagen bus and GM Futurliner #3.

On October 8, 2020, it was announced that the seventh season will premiere on October 21, 2020.

The eighth season began streaming September 28, 2021 on Motor Trend OnDemand with 14 episodes.

The ninth season premiered on October 4, 2022 on Motor Trend. With 20 episodes

References

External links
List of Bitchin' Rides episodes

2010s American reality television series
2014 American television series debuts
Year of television series ending missing
Motor Trend (TV network) original programming